Gyula Andrási (1927 – September 1950) was a Hungarian sprint canoer who competed in the late 1940s. He finished fifth in the K-2 10000 m event at the 1948 Summer Olympics in London.

References
Gyula Andrási's profile at Sports Reference.com

1927 births
1950 deaths
Canoeists at the 1948 Summer Olympics
Hungarian male canoeists
Olympic canoeists of Hungary